The 2014–15 Brisbane Roar FC season was the club's tenth season participating in the A-League, and in the newly formed FFA Cup for the first time, as well as the AFC Champions League for the third time.

Squad lineup for 2014–15
Correct as of 12 December – players' numbers as per the official Brisbane Roar website

 

Current Trialists
N/A

Unsuccessful Trialists
  Lincoln Rule –  Western Pride FC
  Reuben Way –  Olympic FC
  Matt Thurtell –  Brisbane Strikers

Transfers and contracts

New contracts

Senior team

In

Out

Senior team

Overall

Fixtures

Pre-season and friendlies

A-League

Regular season

Finals series

FFA Cup

AFC Champions League

Group stage

Statistics

All competitions

Squad statistics

Squad and statistics accurate as of 4 January 201590 Minutes played is counted as a full game. Injury Time is not counted. A sub's appearance is counted up to the 90th minute as well. If a substitution is made during extra time, it is counted as a full game (90mins) to the player that started. The substitute is credited with the number of minutes made up from 30 seconds for every substitution in the game by both teams combined. If there is an uneven number of substitutions made in total, the number of minutes is rounded up to the following number (2.5 mins = 3 mins).If a shot is taken by a player but then saved by the goalkeeper before a follow up shot scores a goal, the player/s that took the shot before the save is/are NOT credited with an assist. If a penalty is won and scored, the person who was fouled for the penalty is NOT credited with an assist.If a Finals game goes to Extra Time and a substitution is made, per the original rule, only the 30 minutes (2x 15 minute halves) is counted, NOT injury time. If the referee adds injury to either half and a substitution IS made during injury time, it also reverts to the original rule (2.5 mins = 3 mins)
Total Games played: 15
A-League Games played: 13
FFA Cup Games played: 2
ACL Games played: 0
  Player has departed the club mid season
  Player has joined the club mid season
  Player has been injured before or during the season and in turn, has ended their season. For a player to be coloured, they need to miss 6 games before the end of the season (including finals)

 [1] – Jean Carlos Solorzano replaced James Donachie in the 90th minute vs Adelaide United in Round 1. 6 substitutions were made in total (3mins) 
 [2] – Matt Smith replaced Jean Carlos Solorzano in the 90th minute vs Adelaide United in Round 10. 5 substitutions were made in total (3mins) 
 [3] – Shane Stefanutto replaced Adam Sarota in the 90th minute vs Sydney FC in Round 13. 5 substitutions were made in total (3mins)

Disciplinary record

Correct as of 4 January 2015Red card column denotes players who were sent off after receiving a straight red card. The two yellow cards column denotes players who were sent off after receiving two yellow cards. 
  Player has departed the club mid season
  Player has joined the club mid season
  Player has been injured before or during the season and in turn, has ended their season. For a player to be coloured, they need to miss 6 games before the end of the season (including finals)

Home attendance

League attendance and average includes Finals Series

 ACL home games were moved to Robina Stadium.

A-League

HAL results summary

HAL ladder

HAL results and position per round

HAL League goalscorers per round
Correct as of 24 April 2015.* Round 4 was actually played after Round 8, Round 11 after Round 22 and Round 18 after round 25

AFC Champions League

ACL results summary

ACL ladder

ACL results and position per round

ACL League Goalscorers per Round

Correct as of 5 May 2015.

Technical staff

See also
 Brisbane Roar FC records and statistics
 List of Brisbane Roar FC players
 Brisbane Roar end of season awards
 Brisbane Roar website
 A-League website
 National Youth League website

Awards
 NAB Young Footballer of the Month (March) – Brandon Borrello

References

Brisbane Roar
Brisbane Roar FC seasons